The 2013–14 Ligue Magnus season was the 93rd season of the Ligue Magnus, the top level of ice hockey in France. Diables Rouges de Briançon defeated Ducs d'Angers in the championship round.

Regular season

Playoffs

Relegation 
 Brest Albatros Hockey - Drakkars de Caen 3:4 (6:1, 2:3, 4:5, 5:1, 0:1, 3:2 SO, 3:4)

References

1
Fra
Ligue Magnus seasons